Tai Geng or Da Geng, personal name Zi Bian, was a king of the Shang dynasty of ancient China.

In the Records of the Grand Historian he was listed by Sima Qian as the sixth Shang king, succeeding his brother Wo Ding. He was enthroned with Bo as his capital. He ruled for 25 years (although the Bamboo Annals claim 5 years), was given the posthumous name Tai Geng and was succeeded by his son Xiao Jia.

Oracle script inscriptions on bones unearthed at Yinxu alternatively record that he was the fifth Shang king succeeding his uncle Bu Bing, given the posthumous name Da Geng and succeeded by his brother Xiao Jia.

References

Shang dynasty kings